Der blaue Planet (German for The Blue Planet) is a 1982 hit by the East German band Karat. The album of the same title was the most successful album published in East Germany, being sold more than 1.1 million times in East Germany and about 500,000 times in West Germany.

History
The song was on the album with the same name and 2003 the band released a new version of his song.

Track list
 "Der blaue Planet" (5:23)
 "Blumen aus Eis" (3:32)

Chart performance

Credits
 Lyrics: Norbert Kaiser
 Composition: Ulrich Swillms

Melotron version

In 1999, the synthpop band Melotron covered the song and released it on an EP.

Track listing
"Der blaue Planet (Radio Version)"
"Der blaue Planet (Lange Version)"
"Auf der Suche"
"Der blaue Planet (Antiimperialistischer Schutzmix)"
"Neubrandenburg"

Personnel
Andy Krueger, Edgar Slatnow and Kay Hildebrandt

References

1981 singles
Melotron songs
1999 singles
1981 songs